The Frank Tillar Memorial Methodist Episcopal Church, South is a historic church building on West Railroad Street in Tillar, Arkansas.  The church, a 1 story brick Classical Revival building, was built in 1913 by the Pine Bluff firm of Monk and Ritchie.  Its most distinctive feature is its central dome, which is mounted above a band of windows.  The church is named in honor of the congregant who donated $8,000 of the $8,500 cost of its construction.

The church was listed on the National Register of Historic Places in 1997.

See also
National Register of Historic Places listings in Drew County, Arkansas

References

Churches on the National Register of Historic Places in Arkansas
Neoclassical architecture in Arkansas
Churches completed in 1913
Churches in Drew County, Arkansas
1913 establishments in Arkansas
National Register of Historic Places in Drew County, Arkansas
Neoclassical church buildings in the United States